Pierre Blättler (born 3 February 1966) is a retired Dutch football midfielder.

He is the uncle of Tim Blättler.

References

1966 births
Living people
Dutch footballers
Roda JC Kerkrade players
FC St. Gallen players
FC Zürich players
FC Baden players
Germania Teveren players
Association football midfielders
Eredivisie players
Dutch expatriate footballers
Expatriate footballers in Switzerland
Dutch expatriate sportspeople in Switzerland
Expatriate footballers in Germany
Dutch expatriate sportspeople in Germany
Swiss Super League players
Netherlands under-21 international footballers
Sportspeople from Kerkrade
Footballers from Limburg (Netherlands)